The 2016 Perth Darts Masters was the third staging of the tournament by the Professional Darts Corporation, as the sixth and final entry in the 2016 World Series of Darts. The tournament featured 16 players (eight top PDC Players facing eight regional qualifiers) and was held at the Perth Convention and Exhibition Centre in Perth, Western Australia from 25–27 August 2017.

Phil Taylor was the two-times defending champion after defeating James Wade 11–7 in the last year's final, but lost in the first round to the regional qualifier Corey Cadby. 

Michael van Gerwen won the title by defeating Dave Chisnall 11–4 in the final.

Qualifiers
The eight seeded PDC players were:
  Gary Anderson (quarter-finals)
  Michael van Gerwen (winner)
  Phil Taylor (first round)
  Adrian Lewis (quarter-finals)
  James Wade (quarter-finals)
  Dave Chisnall (runner-up)
  Peter Wright (semi-finals)
  Raymond van Barneveld (semi-finals)

The Oceanic qualifiers were:
  Simon Whitlock (first round) 
  Kyle Anderson (first round)
  Corey Cadby (quarter-finals)
  Adam Rowe (first round)
  Kim Lewis (first round)
  David Platt (first round)
  Rob Szabo (first round)
  Koha Kokiri (first round)

Draw

Broadcasting
The tournament was available in the following countries on these channels:

References

Perth Darts Masters
Perth Darts Masters
World Series of Darts
Sports competitions in Perth, Western Australia

2010s in Perth, Western Australia